Chloreuptychia herseis is a species of butterfly in the family Nymphalidae. It is found in Suriname, Guyana, Peru and Brazil (Rio de Janeiro).

References

Butterflies described in 1824
Euptychiina
Fauna of Brazil
Nymphalidae of South America